Diego Aldo Pettorossi (born 13 January 1997) is an Italian sprinter.

Biography
Born in Bologna to an Ivorian father, adopted by an Italian family from Marche, and to a Sardinian mother from Alghero. He started playing basketball in Bologna, and took up athletics by joining Cus Bologna when he was 14.

Achievements

National titles
Pettorossi won a national championships at individual senior level.

Italian Athletics Championships
200 m: 2022

See also
 Italian national track relay team

References

External links
 

1997 births
Living people
Italian male sprinters
Mediterranean Games medalists in athletics
Athletes (track and field) at the 2022 Mediterranean Games
Mediterranean Games gold medalists for Italy
Mediterranean Games silver medalists for Italy